Ice hockey was featured as part of the 2007 Asian Winter Games at the Changchun Fuao Ice Hockey Rink for the Men's and at the Jilin Provincial Skating Rink for the Women's in Changchun. Events were held from 26 January to 3 February 2007.

According to the IIHF World Ranking, Kazakhstan (ranked 11th) were the highest rated team in men's ice hockey, followed by Japan (21st) and China (28th). In the women's World Ranking, China were rated 7th, Kazakhstan 9th and Japan 10th, with North Korea also in the top 20.

Schedule

Medalists

Medal table

Final standing

Men

Women

References
 The 6th Asian Winter Games - Ice Hockey
 Kazakhstan beat Thailand 52-1 at Asian Winter Games, Reuters

 
Winter
2007 Asian Winter Games events
2007
2007
Ice hockey in China